Alejandro "Álex" Remiro Gargallo (born 24 March 1995) is a Spanish professional footballer who plays as a goalkeeper for Real Sociedad.

Formed at Athletic Bilbao, he played as a senior with Basconia, Bilbao Athletic, Levante, Huesca and Real Sociedad. He won the 2020 Copa del Rey with the last club.

Club career

Athletic Bilbao
Born in Cascante, Navarre, Remiro joined Athletic Bilbao's youth system in 2009, aged 14. He made his debut as a senior with the farm team in the 2012–13 season, in Tercera División.

On 26 May 2014, Remiro was promoted to the reserves in Segunda División B. He was named first choice after the departure of Kepa Arrizabalaga in January, and finished the campaign with 23 appearances – play-offs included – as they returned to Segunda División after a 19-year absence.

Remiro made his professional debut on 24 August 2015, starting in a 0–1 home loss against Girona FC. On 22 June of the following year, he was promoted to the first team in La Liga.

Remiro was loaned to second-tier side Levante UD on 1 July 2016, for one year. He was recalled by his parent club late into the following transfer window, however, due to an injury to Kepa.

On 21 July 2017, Remiro moved to division two's SD Huesca on a one-year loan deal. He played a major role in the Aragonese club achieving promotion to the top flight for the first time in their history, only missing one game in 42.

On his return to the San Mamés Stadium, Remiro seemed set to play in the first team after Kepa moved to Chelsea and the other established goalkeeper Iago Herrerín sustained an injury. However, his representatives failed to agree on terms on a new contract with the club, and in response his understudy Unai Simón was selected to play in the first match of the new campaign against CD Leganés; with Simón becoming established in the team and no resolution to the contractual dispute, some weeks later it was confirmed that Remiro wished to leave Athletic and would be allowed to do so on 30 June 2019.

Real Sociedad
Remiro agreed to a four-year deal with Athletic's rivals Real Sociedad on 10 June 2019, effective as of 1 July. He made his league debut on 27 September, keeping a clean sheet in a 3–0 home victory over Deportivo Alavés.

In May 2020, Remiro tested positive for COVID-19. The following 3 April, he started in the delayed final of the Copa del Rey, helping defeat his first club Athletic 1–0 in Seville. On 31 October, he was consoled by former teammates at the end of another Basque derby due to his obvious distress after conceding a late equalising goal with a mistimed attempt to punch the ball clear, when a victory would have put Real Sociedad clear at the top of the table.

Career statistics

Club

Honours
Levante
Segunda División: 2016–17

Real Sociedad
Copa del Rey: 2019–20

References

External links

1995 births
Living people
Spanish footballers
Footballers from Navarre
Association football goalkeepers
La Liga players
Segunda División players
Segunda División B players
Tercera División players
CD Basconia footballers
Bilbao Athletic footballers
Levante UD footballers
Athletic Bilbao footballers
SD Huesca footballers
Real Sociedad footballers
Spain youth international footballers